I Love John Frigo...He Swings was the debut album of jazz violinist Johnny Frigo for Mercury Records. Despite the high caliber of Frigo's collaborators, the album was more or less ignored on its release. It would be decades later that he would get the chance to record as a leader again, in the interim performing mainly as a bassist rather than a violinist.

The material is varied, encompassing "lush instrumentals", "impressionistic pieces", and "soft duets with pianist Mike Simpson". On "Big Me-Little Me", Frigo duets with himself, playing both violin and bass.

Track listing 
"What a Diff'rence a Day Made" – 2:31
"Polka Dots and Moonbeams" – 4:19
"Blow Fiddle Blow" – 2:50
"Blue Orchids" – 3:02
"Gone with the Wind" – 3:04
"Squeeze Me" – 3:37
"You Stepped Out of a Dream" – 2:58
"Moonlight in Vermont" – 3:17
"If Love Is Good to Me" – 3:33
"Big Me-Little Me" – 2:13

Personnel
 Johnny Frigo – violin, double bass
 Cy Touff – trumpet
 Dick Marx – piano, celesta
 Herb Ellis – guitar
 Ray Brown – double bass
 Norm Jeffries – drums

References

1957 debut albums
Johnny Frigo albums
Swing albums
Mercury Records albums